Coulstone is an unincorporated community in western Dent County, in the U.S. state of Missouri.

The community is on Missouri Route 32 adjacent to the Dent-Texas county line. Licking is 5.5 miles to the west and Salem is approximately 14 miles to the northeast along route 32. Pigeon Creek flows past the community.

History
A post office called Coulstone was in operation between 1888 and 1945. The community has the name of W. R. E. Coulstone, a local storekeeper.

References

Unincorporated communities in Dent County, Missouri
Unincorporated communities in Missouri